Dito Godwin (1955–2021) was an American record producer and executive, best known for his production works with Mötley Crüe, Peter Criss and Ace Frehley of Kiss, Great White, and more recently No Doubt, Kevin Carlberg, The Stick People and Kristy Lee Cook of American Idol.

Biography
Godwin started his career in New York as a musician touring with names like Black Sabbath before turning to the administrative and production roles he has worked in for over 25 years in the industry. He has also taught at UCLA, University of Sound Arts, LACC, Southern Oregon University,
and guest spoken at NXNW, SXSW, LAMP and many other music conventions nationwide.

In 2003, Godwin consulted with Tony Brown (then President of MCA Records) choosing material for Wynonna Judd's upcoming CD and represented Susan Gibson, writer of The Dixie Chicks smash hit "Wide Open Spaces".

Dito Godwin was nominated for a directorial award in 2005 for a live music video, "Formula", from the El Rey theater in Los Angeles, CA and is heavily referenced in the 2008 book "Gwen Stefani And No Doubt – A Simple Kind Of Life" written by Jeff Apter.

Having worked and produced with most of the Major record labels, Godwin was also the Director A&R and General Manager of TNT Records in the 1990s and in 2008 he founded EFM Records and is working with several established Artists to release in 2009 on the EFM Record label.

Other 2009 projects include producing a celebrity filled CD with recording Artist and "Stand Up to Cancer" organization supporter Kevin Carlberg, in which all proceeds will be contributed to fighting cancer. Godwin also produced Carlberg's solo CD in early 2008.

Discography 
1982: Mötley Crüe, Too Fast for Love, Promotion
1986: St. Elmo's Fire, St. Elmo's Fire, Dream/ CBS Records
1990: Wildside, Heavy Metal Thunder, HBO
1990: Wildside,"KID", Tapestry Film.
1988: St. Elmo's Fire, Warning from the Sky, Belaphon Records
1991: Tony Newton, Newtons Law, Interscope
1992: Circus, Tonight!, Eire
1992: No Doubt, No Doubt, Interscope
1994: Christine Lunde, Butterflies Are Free, Capitol Records
1995: Wildside, Wildside, Capitol/T.N.T.
1995: Ace Frehley (Kiss), Cat 1, T.N.T.
1995: Peter Criss (Kiss), Cat 1, T.N.T. Rec.
1996: Great White, Let It Rock, JVC
1996: Tim Bogart, Soul of Bass, RCA
1996: Jack Russell, Shelter Me, R.C.A. Japan
1997: Jani Lane (Warrant), Jabberwocky, C.M.C.
2002: Leif Garrett, F8, Indie Release
2003: No Doubt, Singles (tk.15), Interscope
2004: Butterfly, I Can't Make You Love Me, A&M
2004: Charley Pride, Charley Pride, RCA
2006: Eric Martsolf, Eric Martsolf, Star of "Passions" (NBC)
2008: Sick at He\art, Brutality Step 1, My Name Is Bruce (Campbell)  film
2008: Kristy Lee Cook, Kristy Lee Cook, American Idol
2009: Kevin Carlberg, It's for the Better (Single), EFM Records
2009: The Stick People, Trust (Single – Limited Free Download), EFM Records
2010: The Stick People, Think About That (Single), EFM Records
2010: Hear Kitty Kitty, Moody (Single), EFM Records
2010: No Doubt, Icon, USA, Interscope
2013: The Stick People, Madness, EFM Records/Bungalo Records/Universal Music Group
2013: The Stick People, Think About That (Single – Limited Free Download), EFM Records/Bungalo Records/UMG
2013: Substereo, Fuel for the revolution, Gateway Music/Mavin Music

References

External links 
Godwin Productions
Music Biz Academy
Stand Up to Cancer Official Site

1955 births
Living people
Musicians from New York (state)
Record producers from New York (state)
Southern Oregon University faculty
Place of birth missing (living people)
University of California, Los Angeles faculty